Castle Goff is an enclosure about  south-west of Camelford, in Cornwall, England. It is a scheduled monument.

Location and description
Castle Goff is considered to be a "round": these are small circular embanked enclosures, with one entrance; they date from the late Iron Age to the early post-Roman period. They are most common in Cornwall.

It is situated on the southern edge of a ridge between two tributaries of the River Allen.

From the original western entrance, which is now blocked, there is a causeway to an annexe to the west. The rampart of the annexe is partly incorporated into the present field  boundary.

References

Scheduled monuments in Cornwall
Iron Age sites in Cornwall